The Jack Buck is a fireboat operated by the St. Louis Fire Department in St. Louis, Missouri.

She was commissioned On May 17, 2003.
At that time she was the fire department's largest vessel, even though the city described her as a "Boston Whaler".

In 2010 the Jack Buck helped extinguish a fire that destroyed the excursion boat Robert E. Lee.

References

Fireboats of the United States
St. Louis
2003 ships